Kanokkorn Jaicheun (born on June 30, 1986), nicknamed Som is a beauty pageant contestant and actress who won Miss Thailand World 2007 and represented Thailand in Miss World 2007 in China.   She studied Communication at Bangkok University and received her MBA at Sri Patum University.

She is known for her roles in Thai movies Yamada: Samurai of Ayothaya, and Phuchai Lalla.

References

Miss World 2007 delegates
1986 births
Living people
Kanokkorn Jaicheun
Kanokkorn Jaicheun
Kanokkorn Jaicheun
Kanokkorn Jaicheun
Kanokkorn Jaicheun
Miss Thailand World